Carrie may refer to:

People
 Carrie (name), a female given name and occasionally a surname

Places in the United States
 Carrie, Kentucky, an unincorporated community
 Carrie, Virginia, an unincorporated community
 Carrie Glacier, Olympic National Park, Washington

Arts and entertainment
 Carrie (novel), by Stephen King, and its adaptations:
 Carrie (1976 film)
 Carrie (2002 film)
 Carrie (2013 film)
 Carrie (franchise)
 Carrie (musical)
 the title character of Sister Carrie, a 1900 novel by Theodore Dreiser
 Carrie (1952 film), based on Dreiser's novel
 one of the title characters of Carrie and Barry, a BBC sitcom
 Carrie (band), British based rock music band
 "Carrie" (Cliff Richard song) (1980)
 "Carrie" (Europe song) (1987), by Europe

Other uses 
 Carrie (mango), a mango cultivar
 Carrie (digital library), an online digital library project based at the University of Kansas
 Carrie Furnace, an abandoned blast furnace in Swissvale, Pennsylvania
 Tropical Storm Carrie, tropical cyclones named Carrie

See also
 Carri, a surname and given name
 Carey (disambiguation)
 Carry (disambiguation)
 Cary (disambiguation)